Torres Vedras is a municipality in the Portuguese district of Lisbon, approximately  north of the capital Lisbon in the Oeste region, in the Centro of Portugal.

History

In 1148, Afonso I  took the town of Torres Vedras from the Moors, in the then region of Estremadura, an area encircled by gentle hills and valleys. Situated in the former district of Lisbon, Torres Vedras is a strong agricultural region linked with its vineyards and intense commercial and industrial life, resulting in a dynamic pole in the western subregion of Portugal. King Afonso III conceded a foral (charter) in 1250, which was later confirmed by King Manuel I in 1510. This latter decree conferred on the town many of the municipal privileges that it held for 729 years.

While travelling through this district, King Afonso III and Queen Beatrice, ordered the construction of a municipal hall, alongside the ancient castle (which today no longer exists). For his part, King Denis, his successor, was captivated by local Gracia Frois, fathering an illegitimate son, who would go on to be Count of Barcelos.

Later, the municipality was donated to the Queens of the realm, and in particular, under the Aviz dynasty, the Infanta Eleonor (daughter of King Edward and Queen Eleanor), who would later marry Frederick III of Germany, was born in Torres Vedras (18 September 1434).

Torres Vedras continued to be a place of importance: in 1413, King John I met with his council after legitimizing his expedition to Ceuta (marking the beginning of Portuguese maritime expansion); the Regent Peter, convened the Cortes in 1411, to deliberate over the wedding of his daughter Isabel with his nephew Afonso; and the place where King John II received the ambassadors of the Kingdom of Naples, and later the Republic of Venice, in 1496.

At the same time, intrigues and confrontations were fermented in Torres Vedras by local alcaides, such as in 1384 when the Master of Aviz encircled the town in order to force the Castilian alcalde Juan Duque to surrender. It was for the same reason, that King John IV was forced to take city in 1640, when the Portuguese alcaide João Soares de Alarcão, aligned himself with the Philippine monarchs.

In comparison, the loyalty and sympathies of the Portuguese of the region were tested with the French invasions of the Peninsular Wars  (1808–1810). Anticipating the final defeat of the French, General Delaborde's forces were defeated on 21 August 1808, at the battles of Roliça and Vimeiro, by the Anglo-Portuguese Army that had landed at Porto Novo. Junot, who had installed himself in the town, signed a truce and left the town, retreating towards Lisbon, but not before sacking the churches and convents along the way.

Arthur Wellesley, later the Duke of Wellington and Marquess of Torres Vedras, would begin the construction (1809–1810) of the Lines of Torres Vedras that would extend to the sea. This fortified system, which included 152 forts and 628 redoubts, was marked by the Fort of São Vicente, in Torres Vedras. Ironically, the fort only saw battle after the French were removed from Portugal, when Cabralist forces (those supporting politician Costa Cabral) under the Duke of Saldanha, evicted Setembrist forces of the Count of Bonfim.

Over 10,000 troops were involved in the bloody Battle of Torres Vedras, which resulted in the surrender of the Count's forces on 23 December 1846. The deaths of 400 men and 500 wounded, that included Lieutenant-Colonel Luís Mouzinho de Albuquerque, a liberal officer who disembarked in Mindelo and was later buried in the Church of São Pedro.

Following much of its history in battle, Torres Vedras lapsed into years of progress and development, supported by the expansion of the rail-lines in 1886, the installation of the electrical grid in 1912, and finally the canalization of waters to the town by 1926. These changes helped support a growth, construction of new barrios and roadways, resulting in the town's reclassification as a city in 1979.

Geography

Fronting the Atlantic Ocean, Torre Vedres is bordered by the municipalities of Lourinhã (to the north), Alenquer (to the east), Sobral de Monte Agraço (to the southeast) and Mafra (to the south). A dispersed population, Torres Vedras includes 21 urban agglomerations, of which most have less than 200 inhabitants. Altogether the municipality has a population of 79,465.

Administratively, the municipality is divided into 13 civil parishes (freguesias):

 A dos Cunhados e Maceira
 Campelos e Outeiro da Cabeça
 Carvoeira e Carmões
 Dois Portos e Runa
 Freiria
 Maxial e Monte Redondo
 Ponte do Rol
 Ramalhal
 São Pedro da Cadeira
 Torres Vedras (São Pedro e Santiago e Santa Maria do Castelo e São Miguel) e Matacães 
 Silveira
 Turcifal
 Ventosa

The resident population of the city of Torres Vedras (approximately 20,000 inhabitants in two largest urban parishes) represents about 25% of the population of the municipality.

Climate
Torres Vedras has a warm-summer Mediterranean climate with mild, wet winters and warm, dry summers.

Economy and tourism

In 2011, Torres Vedras received the QualityCoast Gold Award for its efforts to become a sustainable tourist destination, and was selected for inclusion in the global atlas for sustainable tourism DestiNet.

The Leonel Trindade Municipal Museum is an archaeological and historical museum in the town, located in a former convent (Convento da Graça) on the southern edge of the city centre. In addition to an extensive archaeological section dating back to late- Palaeolithic times, the museum contains works of art from local churches as well as an exhibition relating to the Lines of Torres Vedras. Much of the archaeological collection comes from the Chalcolithic, fortified settlement known as the Castro of Zambujal (3rd millennium BC) and from the  Tholos do Barro, a Chalcolithic tomb, both of which are in the municipality.

Sport
The local professional football team is S.C.U. Torreense which plays at the Manuel Marques Stadium.

Notable People

 Eleanor of Portugal, Holy Roman Empress (1434–1467)  an infanta (princess), daughter of King Edward of Portugal & Empress of the Holy Roman Empire
 Lopo Soares de Albergaria (c.1460 – c.1520) the third Governor of Portuguese India
 Cristóvão Ferreira (c.1580–1650) a priest and Jesuit missionary who committed apostasy in Japan
 Luís da Silva Mouzinho de Albuquerque (1792–1846) a military officer, poet, scientist and politician
 Manuel Clemente (born 1948) a prelate of the Catholic Church; the Patriarch of Lisbon since 2013
 Carlos Miguel (born 1957) a lawyer, politician and Govt. minister of Romani ethnicity
 Guta Moura Guedes (born 1965) curator, author, journalist and television presenter.
 Beto (1967–2010) a Portuguese singer; lived in Torres Vedras from aged 17 
 Susana Félix (born 1975) a singer, songwriter, musician, actress  and producer.
 Cristina Ferreira (born 1977), journalist, businesswoman and TV host.
 Lisandro Cuxi (born 1999 in Zambujal) a Portuguese–Cape-Verdean singer-songwriter and dancer.

Sport 

 José Pereira (born 1931) a football goalkeeper with 302 caps with Belenenses and 11 for Portugal
 Joaquim Agostinho (19421984) professional bicycle racer
 Vítor Campos (1944-2019) a footballer with 275 caps with Académica
 Hélder Baptista (born 1972) a retired footballer with 311 club caps
 Nelson Pereira (born 1975) football goalkeeper with 201 club caps and 3 for Portugal
 Zé António (born 1977) a Portuguese former footballer with 451 club caps
 Anselmo Cardoso (born 1984 in Freiria) a former footballer with 267 club caps
 André Santos (born 1989) football player with 300 club caps
 Henrique Chaves (born 1997) a Portuguese racing driver.
 Fábio Carvalho (born 2002) footballer who plays for Liverpool.

See also
 Torres Vedras IPR
 Leonel Trindade Municipal Museum, Torres Vedras 
 List of forts of the Lines of Torres Vedras

References

Notes

Sources

External links

Photos from Torres Vedras
Torres Vedras Web
Torres Vedras Antiga
Lugares na minha terra - Torres Vedras
O que visitar em Torres Vedras

 
Cities in Portugal
Populated places in Lisbon District
Municipalities of Lisbon District
Municipalities of Portugal
Lines of Torres Vedras